Shadia is an Egyptian actress and singer. 

Shadia may also refer to
Shadia (given name)
Shadia, Punjab, a town and union council in Pakistan
Shadia railway station